Pristiguana is an extinct genus of primitive iguanids from the Maastrichtian Marília Formation of Brazil. The type species is P. brasiliensis.

Description 
Pristiguana was discovered in the Bauru Group of Brazil. Its discoverers said, in 1973, that it is the oldest fossil lizard in the family Iguanidae. It resembles living primitive South American iguanids in some features, and shares some features with teiids, too.

References

Further reading 
 Richard Estes and Llewellyn I. Price, Iguanid Lizard from the Upper Cretaceous of Brazil, Science, 18 May 1973, vol. 180. no. 4087, pp. 748–751 abstract

Iguanidae
Cretaceous lizards
Late Cretaceous reptiles of South America
Cretaceous Brazil
Maastrichtian life
Marília Formation
Fossils of Brazil
Fossil taxa described in 1973